Nitra is a city in western Slovakia.

Nitra may also refer to:

Nitra (Hasidic dynasty), originating from Nitra, Slovakia
Principality of Nitra, historical entity
Nitra Region, an administrative region in Slovakia
Nitra Arena, a sports arena in Nitra, Slovakia
Nitra Castle, a castle located in the Old Town of Nitra, Slovakia
Nitra (river), river in western Slovakia

See also
FC Nitra, a Slovak association football club, playing in Nitra, Slovakia
HK Nitra, an ice hockey club based in Nitra, Slovakia
MBK SPU Nitra, a basketball club based in Nitra, Slovakia
Nitra nad Ipľom, a village and municipality in the Lučenec District in the Banská Bystrica Region of Slovakia